Myriam Casanova (born 20 June 1985) is a former tennis player from Switzerland.

She was ranked as high as No. 45 on the WTA Tour in singles and won one WTA singles title in her career. In doubles she reached the semifinals of the 2003 US Open, partnering Marion Bartoli of France, and reached a career-high ranking of world No. 19.

WTA career finals

Singles: 2 (1 title, 1 runner-up)

Doubles: 2 (2 runner-ups)

ITF finals

Singles (7–0)

Doubles (3–1)

External links
 
 
 

1985 births
Living people
Swiss female tennis players
Olympic tennis players of Switzerland
Tennis players at the 2004 Summer Olympics
People from Altstätten
Sportspeople from the canton of St. Gallen